Sandra Mayotte is a Mauritian politician in the National Assembly of Mauritius, a former television presenter and a renowned séga artist.

Biography 
Sandra Mayotte lives in Quatre Bornes.

In the early 2000s, she became a presenter for the Mauritius Broadcasting Corporation. A very popular singer in the Indian Ocean region, she often occupies the music scene of Mauritius and elsewhere. She was a Choriste within the group Cassiya in 1998, which is how she made her beginnings as a singer. Winner of the Kora Award in 2001 as best artist of East Africa, she has been pursuing her career for 20 years now. In January 2018 she was chosen to present the Mauritian version of the show Who Wants to Be a Millionaire?.

Song Charts 

 Kayambo
 Makalapo
 Mo Kontan Twa
 Kot Li Finn Ale
 La Limier Dan Lakaz
 Vinn danse ar moi Doumanawi

Awards and recognition 

 Kora Awards, catégorie Meilleure artiste féminine d'Afrique de l'Est en 2001
 Disque de l'année pour Kot sa li fine alé en 2008
 Disque de l'année avec Désiré François pour Voisin Voisine
 Disque de l'année pour Kayambo

Notes and References

See also

Related articles 
 Mauritian culture

Mauritian singers
Year of birth missing (living people)
Living people
Mauritian television people